Pomatoschistus norvegicus, the Norway goby, is a species of goby native to the eastern Atlantic from Lofoten to the western English Channel and has also been recorded from the Mediterranean Sea. This species can reach a length of  TL.

References

Pomatoschistus
Fish of the Atlantic Ocean
Fish of Europe
Fish of the Mediterranean Sea
Fish of the North Sea
Fish described in 1902
Taxa named by Robert Collett